Bird Rock may refer to the following places:

Australia
Bird Rock (Tasmania)
Bird Rock (Point Lillias), Victoria
Bird Rock, the name of several rocks in Western Australia
Bird Rock, (Norfolk Island)

Canada
Bird Rock (Magdalen Islands), the location of a lighthouses in Canada
Bird Rock (Newfoundland), seabird colony at Cape St. Mary's Ecological Reserve

Caribbean
Bird Rock, Basseterre Valley, Saint Kitts
Bird Rock, Maycock's Bay, Barbados
Bird Rock, Dominica, otherwise known as Isla de Aves, a Caribbean dependency of Venezuela

United Kingdom
Craig yr Aderyn, or Birds' Rock, in Gwynedd, Wales

United States
Bird Rock (Marin County, California)
Bird Rock, San Diego, a neighborhood of La Jolla, California
Bird Rock State Marine Conservation Area and Blue Cavern State Marine Conservation Areas, Catalina Island, California

See also
Bird Island (disambiguation)
 Bird Key and Bird Key (Miami), islands in Florida, U.S.